This is a list of settlements in North America by founding year and present-day country.

See also 

 List of cities in the Americas by year of foundation
List of Hudson's Bay Company trading posts
List of French forts in North America
Former colonies and territories in Canada
Timeline of the European colonization of North America

References 

Bibliography
Gary S. Breschini, Ph.D.
Kent Seavey.
 http://www.tshaonline.org/handbook/online/articles/hny06

Settlements by year of foundation
Historical geography
Lists of cities in the Americas
North America-related lists